Koharik Alis Gazarossian (Goharik Alis Łazarosian) (21 December 1907 – 29 October 1967) was an Armenian composer and pianist. She was born in Constantinople (Istanbul) and entered the Paris Conservatory in 1926 where she studied with Paul Dukas and Lazare Lévy. After completing her studies, she performed as a concert pianist in Europe and worked as a composer. She died in Paris.

Works
Gazarossian composed piano, chamber and vocal works, and often incorporated liturgical or folk songs into her compositions. Selected works include:
Sonata for piano
Etude, no. 9
Suite for piano
Quartetto d'Archi
Tre Canti Populari Armeni
Preludes - Les Armeniannes
3 pieces for violin and piano:
"O fille ta mere est morte"  (O girl! Your mother is dead), a slow funeral moody piece announcing to the young lady that her mother died.
"La lune de la nuit" (The moon at night)
"O fille ton nom est Chuchan" ( O girl! Your name is Chouchan), a very vivid Armenian dance.

These three works are transcribed from the original piano version to violin and piano dedicated to violinist Berdj Dinanian who is  Armenian from Istanbul and died in Paris in early 2014 (source: communication with his son Chahan Dinanian a cellist in France). A former pupil of Mr. Dinanian (Anthony Hudaverdi) lives in Los Angeles, CA, and has plans to premiere the works in the near future.

References

1907 births
1967 deaths
Musicians from Istanbul
20th-century classical composers
Women classical composers
Armenian composers
Armenians from the Ottoman Empire
20th-century women composers